Regina Veloso (born 27 March 1939) is a Portuguese former swimmer. She competed in the women's 200 metre breaststroke at the 1960 Summer Olympics.

References

1939 births
Living people
Portuguese female swimmers
Olympic swimmers of Portugal
Swimmers at the 1960 Summer Olympics
People from Zambezia Province
Portuguese female breaststroke swimmers